Thoosa is a genus of sea sponges in the family Thoosidae. This genus is known for boring holes in corals. It contains sixteen described species.

Species
Species in this genus include:
 Thoosa amphiasterina Topsent, 1920
 Thoosa armata Topsent, 1888
 Thoosa bulbosa Hancock, 1849
 Thoosa cactoides Hancock, 1849
 Thoosa calpulli Carballo, Cruz-Barraza & Gomez, 2004
 Thoosa circumflexa Topsent, 1891
 Thoosa fischeri Topsent, 1891
 Thoosa laeviaster Annandale, 1915
 Thoosa letellieri Topsent, 1891
 Thoosa midwayi Azzini, Calcinai, Iwasaki & Bavestrello, 2007
 Thoosa mismalolli Carballo, Cruz-Barraza & Gomez, 2004
 Thoosa mollis Volz, 1939
 Thoosa purpurea Cruz-Barraza, Carballo, Bautista-Guerrero & Nava, 2011
 Thoosa radiata Topsent, 1887
 Thoosa socialis Carter, 1880
 Thoosa tortonesei Sarà, 1958

References

Tetractinomorpha